Schinia tuberculum is a moth of the family Noctuidae. It is found from New York to Florida, west to Oklahoma and Texas.

Its wingspan is about 20 mm. Adults are on wing from August to October. There is one generation per year.

The larvae feed on Pityopsis graminifolia.

External links
Images
Butterflies and Moths of North America
Schinia tuberculum in Louisiana

Schinia
Moths of North America